The 2nd Air Force Wing Reserve, Philippine Air Force (2nd AFWR PAF), is a combat and service support unit of the Philippine Air Force Reserve under the Air Force Reserve Command (AFRC), Philippine Air Force (PAF).  It is based in Clark Air Base in Mabalacat City, Pampanga, Philippines.  The wing covers the area from Central Luzon up to all of northern Luzon.  2nd AFWR is divided into the 21st, 22nd, and 23rd Air Force Groups Reserve (AFGR).  Currently, the 2nd AFWR is under the command of Brigadier General Artemio A. Adasa Jr., PAFR.

A reserve wing in the Philippine Air Force is equivalent in size to a brigade in the army.  A reserve air group is equivalent to a battalion.  Subordinate units in the reserve air group include squadrons (companies) and flights (platoons).

In Luzon, the other air force reserve wings are the 1st AFWR based at Colonel Jesus A. Villamor Air Base that covers all Air Force reserve units in the National Capital Region (NCR), and the 3rd AFWR at Fernando Air Base in Batangas that covers all of southern Luzon from Cavite through the Bicol Region.

Units
The following are the units of the 2nd Air Force Wing Reserve:
21st Air Force Group Reserve – Loakan Airport, Baguio City, Benguet
22nd Air Force Group Reserve – TOG 2, Cauayan City, Isabela City
23rd Air Force Group Reserve – Cesar Basa Air Base, Floridablanca, Pampanga

References

External links

Philippine Air Force Reserve Command — official website

Reserve and Auxiliary Units of the Philippine Military
Military units and formations of the Philippine Air Force
Philippines